Palemydops is an extinct genus of non-mammalian synapsid.

References
 The main groups of non-mammalian synapsids at Mikko's Phylogeny Archive

Dicynodonts
Lopingian synapsids of Africa
Fossil taxa described in 1921
Taxa named by Robert Broom